Katumba Songwe, also Katumbasongwe, is an administrative ward in the Kyela District of the Mbeya Region of Tanzania. In 2016 the Tanzania National Bureau of Statistics report there were 8,615 people in the ward, from 13,895 in 2012.

Villages / vitongoji 
The ward has 5 villages and 20 vitongoji.

 Isaki
 Isaki I
 Isaki II
 Katumba
 Ilopa
 Katumba
 Masoko I
 Masoko II
 Mbugujo
 Kabanga
 Kabanga
 Lusungo
 Tenende
 Mpunguti
 Itekenya "A"
 Itekenya "B"
 Lamya
 Mpunguti A
 Mpunguti B
 Ndwanga
 Katumbati
 Ndanganyika
 Ndwanga "A"
 Ndwanga "B"
 Usalama

References 

Wards of Mbeya Region